Musaköy can refer to:

 Musaköy, Çanakkale
 Musaköy, İnebolu
 Musaköy, Ilgaz
 another name for Xanlıqlar, Qazakh